"Breaker 1/9" is a song by Common, released in 1993 as the second single from his debut album Can I Borrow a Dollar?. Produced by Immenslope and The Twilite Tone, it samples both "Between the Sheets" by The Isley Brothers and also contains a lyric from the theme to Three’s Company. Its beat also contains "booming" drums sampled from "Get Out of My Life, Woman" by Lee Dorsey and made for the "jeep beat collective." Its lyrics recount romantic adventures humorously. It holds the worst chart position of any single from that album, yet still reached #10 on the Hot Rap Singles chart.

"Breaker 1/9" is originally a Citizens' Band radio slang term telling other CB users that you'd like to start a transmission on channel 19, and is the phrase that starts C. W. McCall's 1975 novelty hit "Convoy".

Track listing

A-side
 "Breaker 1/9 (LP Radio Edit)" (4:02)
 "Breaker 1/9 (Slope Remix)" (4:18)
 "Breaker 1/9 (LP Instrumental)" (4:02)

B-side
 "Breaker 1/9 (Beat Nuts Remix)" (4:32)
 "Breaker 1/9 (Beat Nuts Instrumental)" (4:32)
 "Breaker 1/9 (Slope Instrumental)" (4:18)

See also
List of Common songs

References

Chart positions

1993 singles
Common (rapper) songs
Song recordings produced by No I.D.
1993 songs
Songs written by Common (rapper)
Songs written by No I.D.
Relativity Records singles